The discography of the American rock band Story of the Year consists of six studio albums, one live album, three extended plays, nineteen singles, one video album, and seventeen music videos.

Albums

Studio albums

Live albums

Video albums

Extended plays

Singles

Music videos

References

Discographies of American artists